Oolambeyan is a 22,231 hectare national park located south of Carrathool and  south east of Hay in the Riverina region of south western New South Wales, Australia.

Oolambeyan Station was once a grazing property for its merino stud which was purchased by the Government of New South Wales in November 2001.

Park provides a great opportunity for day visitors to activities such as bushwalking, picnicking and bird watching, near Hay and Griffith.

Among the animal species, carpet snakes, shingle-backed lizards, lace monitors, gray and red kangaroos can be found here.

See also 
 Protected areas of New South Wales

References 

National parks of New South Wales
Protected areas established in 2001
2001 establishments in Australia